List of Colección Patricia Phelps de Cisneros publications is a collection of exhibition catalogs, scholarly works, and ebooks focused on Latin American art published by Colección Patricia Phelps de Cisneros (CPPC), a privately held Latin American art collection organization founded by Patricia Phelps de Cisneros and Gustavo Cisneros based in Venezuela and New York City.

History 
Since the 1990s, the Colección Patricia Phelps de Cisneros was created with a goal of bringing visibility and impact to the way Latin American art history is viewed and appreciated both on a regional and international level. As part of its four-pronged approach, CPPC lends artworks often in traveling exhibitions held at major institutional partners with accompanying exhibition catalogs that include essays, manifestos, and bibliographic profiles. CPPC works with scholars and academics to learn more about the artists and their works, and has established a prolific publications program to provide supporting information about the artists and their work, in addition to building an online forum for the artwork.

Impact 
The publication program of Colección Patricia Phelps de Cisneros that is represented here is unique in its international and pan-regional scope. Works are typically published in multiple languages, often within the same publication. The publications are oftentimes the first time the collection and curation of information about certain artists and regional and national art movements are published. Contributors are established art historians, curators, and often the artists who are working within or are part of the art movements themselves. Art movement manifestos are published in their entirety, often with full translations, in accessible and/or digital format, sometimes for the first time.

CPPC has published over 60 publications and has released e-books as part of its Conversaciones series, which are also made available in e-book format.

Publications 
In chronological order
  
   – Catalog of an exhibition shown from 6 Aug. 1999 to 27 Feb. 2000 at the Kunst- und Ausstellungshalle der Bundesrepublik Deutschland in Bonn
   – Conferencia en el ciclo Horizontes Constructivos: la perspectiva latinoamericana, Centro de estudios de la modernidad, Universidad de Texas en Austin / "Constructive Horizons: The Latin American Perspective" at Blanton Museum of Art, and the Center for the Study of Modernity of the University of Texas at Austin.
  
  
  
   – Exposition held at The Bellevue, Biarritz, France, 11 July-7 October 2001
  
   – Exhibition at the Fogg Art Museum, Cambridge, MA, 3 March-4 November 2001
  
  
  
   – Catalog of an exhibition held at Museu de Arte Moderna de São Paulo, March 23-June 16, 2002
   – Centro de Estudios de la Modernidad, Universidad de Texas en Austin = Cisneros Collection, Jack S. Blanton Museum of Art, Center of Study of Modernity, University of Texas at Austin
   – Academic conference at Museo de Bellas Artes, Caracas in 2003.
  
  
  
   – Catalogue of an exhibition held in 2003 at the Museo Nacional de Artes Visuales (MNAV) de Montevideo
   – Catalogue of an exhibition held in 2003 at the Museo de Arte Latinoamericano de Buenos Aires (MALBA), 14 March-19 May 2003.
  
  
   – Catalog of an exhibition held at the Museo de Bellas Artes, Caracas, November 2000 - April, 2001. Preparado por la Fundación Museo de Bellas Artes, con la colaboracíon y asistencia de la Fundación Gego en ocasión de la exposición Gego 1955-1990 que se presentó en el Museo de Ballas Artes de Caracas en noviembre del 2000 a abril del 2001
   – Catalog of an exhibition held at Museo de Arte Moderno Jesus Soto in 2004-2005.
  
   – Catálogo de exposição realizada no Museo Nacional de Bellas Artes de Santiago, no Chile, de novembro de 2004 a fevereiro de 2005
   – Exhibition catalog Museo de Arte de Lima, Peru (July–September 2004)
   – Exhibition catalog Museo de Arte Moderna de Bogotá, May 5-June 29, 2005
  
   – Catalog of an exhibition held at Centro de Arte de Maracaibo Lía Bermúdez, July 14-Oct. 2, 2005.
  
   – Exhibition at the Russian Academy of Sciences, St. Petersburg, December 2005-November 2006.
 
   – Museo de Arte y Diseño Contemporáneo, San José, Costa Rica, 7 de diciembre de 2005 al 25 de febrero de 2006; Museo de Arte de El Salvador, San Salvador, El Salvador, 4 de abril al 24 de junio de 2006; a contra corriente, Mira Schendel, Gego y Lygia Pape: obras de la Colección Cisneros, TEOR/éTica, San José, Costa Rica, 7 de diciembre de 2005 al 19 febrero de 2006
   – Catalog of an exhibition held at the Museo del Placio de Bellas Artes, Mexico City, Aug. 2-Oct. 22, 2006
   – 2 volume set
   – Exhibition held June 29-November 1, 2006
   – 16 de febrero al 6 de abril de 2006, Instituto de Estudios Superiores de Administración, IESA, Caracas, Venezuela
   – Catálogo de la exposición del mismo nombre celebrada en Santiago de los Caballeros, República Dominicana, del 21 de junio al 16 de septiembre. Catalog of an exhibition held at Centro León, Santiago de los Caballeros, Dominican Republic, Jun. 21-Sept. 16, 2007
   – Published on the occasion of the exhibition held Feb. 20-Apr. 22, 2007, Blanton Museum of Art, Austin, and Sept. 12-Dec. 8, 2007, Grey Art Gallery, New York University, New York
   – Catalog of an exhibition held at the Beard and Weil Galleries, Wheaton College, Norton, Mass., Feb. 4-Apr. 10, 2008
  
   – Catalog of an exhibition held at Fundação Iberê Camargo, Porto Alegre, Brazil, July 29-Oct. 31, 2010 and at Pinacoteca do Estado de São Paulo, São Paulo, Brazil, Nov. 27, 2010-Jan. 30, 2011
   – Exhibition catalog of Cold America, Geometric Abstraction in Latin America (1934–1973), Fundación Juan March, Madrid, February 11-May 15, 2011
   – This catalogue and its Spanish edition are published on the occasion of the exhibition
   – Folleto de la expoción celebrada América fría. La abstracción geométrica en Latinoamerica (1934–1973) en la Fundación Juan March en Madrid del 11 de febrero al 15 de mayo de 2011
   – Published on the occasion of an exhibition of the same name held at Museo Nacional Centro de Arte Reina Sofía, Madrid, Spain, January 22-September 16, 2013
   – Obra publicada con motivo de la exposición homónima celebrada en el Museo Reina Sofía del 22 de enero al 16 de septiembre de 2013
   – Catalogue qui accompagne une exposition de la "Fundación Cisneros Orinoco Collection", tenu au "Museo Centro Gaiás" dans la "Cidade da Cultura de Galicia."
   – Published in conjunction with an exhibition organized by and held at the Brooklyn Museum, Sept. 20, 2013-Jan. 12, 2014. Also held at the Albuquerque Museum of Art and History, Feb. 16-May 18, 2014, New Orleans Museum of Art, Jun. 20-Sept. 21, 2014, and the John and Mable Ringling Museum of Art, Oct. 17, 2014-Jan. 11, 2015
  
  
  
  
   – Catalog of an exhibition held at Museo Amparo in Puebla, Mexico (February–July 2019)

Conversaciones/Conversations series

Further reading

Manifestos, art movement statements

References

External links 
 
  – Geometric abstract art from South America (1930s–1970s)

Art history books
Latin American art
Publications by publisher
Venezuelan art
Art collections in Venezuela
Art collections in the United States